Charles Olivier de Penne (Paris, January 11, 1831 - Bourron-Marlotte, April 18, 1897) was a French painter. He belonged to the School of Barbizon.

Biography 
Charles-Olivier de Penne was initially a painter of historical scenes, but, as soon as he came into contact with the school of Barbizon, he switched to landscape painting, in which he poured his passion for animals. He became famous for his paintings of hunting scenes or landscapes with animals.

He attempted the grand Prix de Rome in 1857, but only got the second prize with the work Jésus et la Samaritaine. He then exhibited regularly at both the Paris Salon and the Salon des Artistes Français, where he won a bronze medal in 1872 and a silver medal in 1883. Another silver medal was awarded to him at the 1889 Expo.

Main works in museums 

 Le duc d'Orléans, chassant à courre au Bosquet de Sylvie en 1841, Condé museum.
 Hallali du cerf dans l'étang de Sylvie, Condé museum, Chantilly.
 Relais de chiens, "Vénerie de Senlis" museum.
 Chiens au repos, museum of Rennes.
 Chiens courants, Liegi
 Chiens basset, Montréal

Gallery

References

Bibliography 

 Guy de Laporte, Chasse à courre, chasse de cour, Edizione Renaissance Du Livre, 2004 - ISBN 9782804609085
 Claude Marumo, Charles Olivier de Penne,  in  Barbizon et les paysagistes du XIXe.  Edizioni "de l'amateur", Parigi, 1975. OCLC 2165633

Related articles 

 Barbizon school
 Expo 1889

Other projects 

  Wikimedia Commons contiene immagini o altri file su Charles Olivier de Penne

1897 deaths
1831 births
19th-century French painters